Mumin Abdi shire is a Puntland police chief and former Mudug Region Police Commissioner officer. He is the current Police Commissioner of Puntland Police Force.

See also
Puntland Police Force

References

Somalian police chiefs
Living people
1981 births